The Taurus 608 was produced in 1997 in response to Smith & Wesson's .357 Model 686 Plus, which was chambered for seven rounds. Taurus re-chambered their large-frame 607 to hold eight rounds. This revolver was designed to achieve smooth trigger action.

Also, the rear sight is adjustable. It has factory porting for release of gases, reducing recoil. The Model 608 is available in three different barrel lengths. Scope mount bases are available to match the finish for the larger models.

References
 http://www.taurususa.com/products/product-details.cfm?id=249&category=Revolver
 http://www.taurususa.com/products/product-details.cfm?id=250&category=Revolver
 http://www.taurususa.com/products/product-details.cfm?id=251&category=Revolver

External links
Taurus Revolver Information

Taurus revolvers
.357 Magnum firearms